The Arjuna Award, officially known as the Arjuna Awards for Outstanding Performance in Sports and Games, is the sports honour of the Republic of India. It is awarded annually by the Ministry of Youth Affairs and Sports. Before the introduction of the Major Dhyan Chand Khel Ratna in 1991–1992, the Arjuna award was the highest sporting honour of India.

Name
The award is named after Arjuna, a character from the Sanskrit epic Mahabharata of ancient India. He is one of the Pandavas, depicted as a skilled archer winning the hand of Draupadi in marriage. In the Kurukshetra War, Lord Krishna becomes his charioteer teaching him the sacred knowledge of Gita. In Hindu mythology, he has been seen as a symbol of hard work, dedication and concentration.

History
Instituted in 1961 to honour the outstanding sportspersons of the country, the award over the years has undergone a number of expansions, reviews, and rationalizations. The award was expanded to include all the recognised disciplines in 1977, has introduced indigenous games and physically handicapped categories in 1995 and introduced a lifetime contribution category in 1995 leading to creation of a separate Dhyan Chand Award in 2002. The latest revision in 2018 stipulates that the award is given only to the disciplines included in the events like Olympic Games, Paralympic Games, Asian Games, Commonwealth Games, World Championship and World Cup along with Cricket, Indigenous Games, and Parasports. It also recommends giving only fifteen awards in a year, relaxing in case of excellent performance in major multi-sport events, team sports, across gender and giving at least one award to the physically challenged category.

The nominations for the award are received from all government-recognised National Sports Federations, the Indian Olympic Association, the Sports Authority of India (SAI), the Sports Promotion and Control Boards, the state and the union territory governments and the Rajiv Gandhi Khel Ratna, Arjuna, Dhyan Chand and Dronacharya awardees of the previous years. The recipients are selected by a committee constituted by the Ministry and are honoured for their "good performance in the field of sports over a period of four years" at international level and for having shown "qualities of leadership, sportsmanship and a sense of discipline".

Recipients
A total of 178 awards were presented in the 2010s: fifteen in 2010, followed by nineteen in 2011, twenty-five in 2012, fourteen in 2013, sixteen in 2014, seventeen in 2015, sixteen in 2016, seventeen in 2017, twenty in 2018 and nineteen in 2019. Individuals from thirty different sports were awarded, including twenty-seven from athletics, sixteen from wrestling, fifteen from shooting, twelve each from cricket and hockey, eleven each from badminton and boxing, nine from kabaddi, eight from archery, six from table tennis, five each from football and swimming, four each from golf, weightlifting and wushu, three each from billiards & snooker, lawn tennis, polo, squash and volleyball, two each from basketball, chess, gymnastics and rowing, and one each from bodybuilding, equestrian, judo, motor sports, roller skating and yachting.

In the initial list of 2013, triple jumper Renjith Maheshwary was mentioned in the discipline of athletics. However, after reports surfaced of him failing a doping test in 2008, he was denied the award, making him the first person to be recommended by the Sports Ministry and then denied the award on the day of the function. Boxer Manoj Kumar, a gold medalist at the 2010 Commonwealth Games held at Delhi, was initially not on the 2014 awardees list. He filed a case in Delhi High Court and the Sports Ministry was directed by the court to present him with the award. The ministry blamed the issue on mistakenly believing him to be involved in a doping case and presented him with the award in November 2014, instead of at the official ceremony at Rashtrapati Bhavan in August 2014. Another sportsperson, para-badminton player Raj Kumar, a gold medalist in the 2015 Para-Badminton World Championships in England, approached the Delhi High Court after not being awarded the Arjuna Award in 2016. He finally won the legal battle over having higher points than the other para-athlete awarded, and two years later, in September 2018 was given the award for the year 2016.

List of Recipients

Explanatory notes

Reference

External links
  (official website)

 
Indian sports trophies and awards
Lists of Indian award winners